Santo Estêvão may refer to:

Places 
Brazil
 Santo Estêvão, Bahia

India
 St Estevam, Goa

Portugal
 Santo Estêvão (Alenquer)
 Santo Estêvão (Lisbon)
 Santo Estêvão (Tavira)

Other uses 
 Doña Blanca, a wine grape

See also 
 St. Stephen (disambiguation)